Haddo House is a Scottish stately home located near Tarves in Aberdeenshire, approximately  north of Aberdeen. It has been owned by the National Trust for Scotland since 1979.

The Gordons, who later became the Earls of Aberdeen and Marquesses of Aberdeen, have lived on the site for over 500 years. Haddo House sits in or near the site of the old Kellie Castle, the family's previous dwelling which was burnt down by the Covenanters and dates from 1732; it was designed by William Adam in the Georgian Palladian style. The interior of the house though is late Victorian in style, having undergone refurbishment in 1880 by Wright and Mansfield. Haddo contains a large art collection, including a series of 85 castles by James Giles, an early work by Claude Lorrain and a Madonna believed to be by Raphael.  There are also several portraits of 19th-century British politicians.

A specially-made display cabinet contains the Cabot Commemorative State Dinner Service. The hand-painted porcelain service with twenty-four settings for an eight-course meal was made by members of the Woman's Art Association of Canada in 1897. The Canadian government declined to pay the CDN$1,000 asking price. It was purchased privately by members of the House and Senate of Canada and presented on 12 June 1898 to Lady Aberdeen on the occasion of her husband ending his term as Governor-General of Canada.

John Smith did the design work for the kitchens and peripheral buildings in 1843. He returned there in 1845 and built the gate houses at the North and South entrances. Constructed in a rough coarse granite, these single storey buildings are in a Tudor style.

Haddo House's most notable former resident was George Hamilton-Gordon, 4th Earl of Aberdeen, the British prime minister from 1852–1855.

Another notable period in its history was during WW2 when the house became a maternity hospital for the evacuated mothers of Glasgow.  Nearly 1200 babies were born at Haddo Emergency Hospital, as it was known, and many still come back to visit known affectionately as the Haddo Babies.

The house has a small chapel attached. In the grounds is a theatre, Haddo House Hall, and rehearsal rooms, known as the Peatyards. Haddo House Choral & Operatic Society (HHCOS), a large and vibrant choral society formed in 1945, has its operations base there. For over sixty years it has been noted for its annual musical and operatic productions.

In 2021, around 100,000 trees were destroyed during Storm Arwen. It is estimated that it will take a generation for the estate to return to its pre-storm way.

References

External links

Category A listed buildings in Aberdeenshire
Country houses in Aberdeenshire
Gardens in Aberdeenshire
Historic house museums in Aberdeenshire
Inventory of Gardens and Designed Landscapes
William Adam buildings
House of Gordon